Aunn Zara is a Pakistan drama series telecast on A-Plus Entertainment. It revolves around a married couple spoilt by their respective families and are desperate to escape this attention. It is based on Faiza Iftikhar's novel, Hisaar-e-Mohabbat (Fort of Love) and is directed by Haissam Hussain. It stars Maya Ali and Osman Khalid Butt.

Plot

The story revolves around the lives of Aunn and Zara. Aunn being the only male in his family is overtly pampered by everyone. Zara lives with her father and grandfather. Her father, Jamshed, a retired army officer, wants Zara to join the air force. However, Zara wants to have a family life. 

Aunn and Zara's first encounter upsets them. A misunderstanding lands Aunn's proposal in front of Zara's family. Unaware of the proposal, Zara lies to her father that she loves Aunn.   

When Aunn and Zara discover who they are marrying, they resist but eventually get married. The duo spend time together and eventually fall in love. Aunn realizes that his family is overbearing, and he cannot spend time with Zara. He creates misunderstandings between Zara and his family. Soon a rift gets created between Zara and Aunn's family, resulting in Aunn and Zara shifting to another house. Zara learns that she is pregnant. 

Zara's friend, Shehna, clears the misunderstanding between Nighat and Zara. Meanwhile, Aunn informs his family about Zara's pregnancy. Aunn's family gets excited, but they fear that Zara might want to keep them away from the baby. Nighat informs the family about Aunn's past actions leading to the strained relationship with Zara. Aunn also confesses his mistakes. Zara eventually reconciles with Aunn's family.

Cast 

 Maya Ali as Zara
 Osman Khalid Butt as Aunn
 Irfan Khoosat as Zara's paternal grandfather
 Nasreen Qureshi as Aunn's paternal grandmother
 Hina Khawaja Bayat as Husna 
 Sabreen Hisbani as Nighat  
 Mukarram Kaleem as Manzar  
 Adnan Jaffar as Zara's father Jamshed  
 Yasir Masher as Aunn's paternal Uncle
 Mahira Bhatti as Shehna  
 Saima Saleem as Aunn's paternal aunt

Soundtrack

The theme song (original soundtrack) "Aunn Zara" was composed by MAD Music with the lyrics by Awais Sohail. It was sung by Athar and Ragini. Other background music are also composed by MAD music.

Broadcast and release

National and international broadcast
The show rebroadcast in Pakistan on ATV (Pakistan) with the title Deewane Do.

Digital release 
The show was made available on ZEE5 as VOD in 2020.

Awards and nominations

References

External links 
 Aunn Zara Facebook page
Official Website at ZEE5

A-Plus TV original programming
2013 Pakistani television series debuts
Pakistani drama television series
Urdu-language telenovelas
Pakistani telenovelas
Zee Zindagi original programming
Television shows set in Lahore